A storm is a severe weather condition.

Storm(s) or The Storm may also refer to:

Places 
 Storm Bay, Tasmania, Australia
 Storm Mountain (disambiguation)
 Storm Peak, Ross Dependency, Antarctica
 Storms, Ohio, a community in the United States
 Storms River, South Africa

People 
 Storm (given name)
 Storm (surname)
 Storms (surname)
 nickname of Storm Davis (born 1961), American retired Major League Baseball pitcher
 Storm (rapper) or Donna Harkness, member of American hip hop group Outlawz

Arts and entertainment

Fictional characters
 Storm (comics), several comic book characters
 Storm (Marvel Comics), a Marvel Comics superhero
 Storm the Albatross, a character in the Sonic the Hedgehog franchise video games and comics
 Storm 2, a fighting robot that competed in Robot Wars
 Serge A. Storms, the main character in most of Tim Dorsey's novels

Films 
 Storms (film), a 1953 French-Italian film starring Jean Gabin
 Storm (1987 film), starring Stan Kane
 Storm (1999 film), starring Luke Perry and Martin Sheen
 Storm, a 2002 documentary on snow-skiing by Warren Miller
 Storm (2005 film), a Swedish fantasy-thriller
 Storm (2009 film), a political thriller by Hans-Christian Schmid
 The Final Storm (film) (2009), directed by Uwe Boll with the working title The Storm 
 The Storm (1916 film), a silent film starring Blanche Sweet
 The Storm (1922 film), a silent northwoods melodrama
 The Storm (1930 film), starring Lupe Velez
 The Storm (1933 film), a Soviet film
 The Storm (1938 film), an American action film
 The Storm (2009 film), a Dutch film about the North Sea flood of 1953

Games
 Storm, a puzzle platform game developed by indiePub
 Storm: Frontline Nation, a 2011 turn-based strategy video game

Literature 
 Storm (Angler novel), a 2013 novel by Evan Angler
 Storm (Stewart novel), a 1941 novel by George Rippey Stewart
 Storm (novella), a 1985 children's book by Kevin Crossley-Holland
 The Storm (Buechner novel), a 1998 novel by Frederick Buechner
 The Storm (Cussler and Brown novel), a 2012 mystery novel by Clive Cussler and Graham Brown
 The Storm (Daniel Defoe), a 1704 account of a hurricane in Britain
 "The Storm" (short story), by Kate Chopin
 "The Storm" (Utterson short story), by Sarah Elizabeth Utterson
 The Storm (Ostrovsky), sometimes translated as The Thunderstorm, a drama in five acts
 The Storm (Strindberg), one of Strindberg's chamber plays
 "The Storm", a poem by Aleister Crowley
 "Storm", a pro-science beat poem by Tim Minchin

Music 
 The Storm (Tchaikovsky), an overture

Groups
 Storm (British band), a duo featuring James McNally and Tom McManamon
 Storm (German band), a late-1990s Trance duo
 Storm (Norwegian band), an early-1990s metal band
 The Storm (American band), a 1990s rock band
 The Storm (Danish band), a pop/rock band

Albums 
 Storm (Assemblage 23 album) (2004)
 Storm (Heather Nova album) (2003)
 Storm (Skazi album) (2002)
 Storm (Theatre of Tragedy album) (2006)
 Storm (Vanessa-Mae album) (1998)
 Storms (Nanci Griffith album) (1988)
 Storms (Hedley album) (2011)
 Celtic Thunder: Storm, a 2011 album
 Da Storm, a 1996 album by O.G.C.
 The Storm (Karnataka album) (2000)
 The Storm (Moving Hearts album) (1985)
 The Storm (Travis Tritt album) (2007)
 The Storm (Tech N9ne album) (2016)
 The Storm (ZZ Ward album) (2017)
 The Storm, a reggae album from 1994 with The Gladiators

Songs 
 "Storm" (Lenny Kravitz song), 2004
 "Storm" (Luna Sea song), 1998
 "Storm" (Theatre of Tragedy song), 2006
 "Storm" (SuRie song), 2018
 "Storm" (Victor Crone song), 2019
 "Running Through the Fire (Storm)", originally called "Storm", a 2010 single by Anika Moa
 "Everything We Need", originally called "The Storm", a 2019 song by Kanye West
 "Storm", a song by Godspeed You! Black Emperor from Lift Your Skinny Fists Like Antennas to Heaven
 "Storm", a song by Lifehouse from Who We Are
 "Storm", a song by Saliva from Back into Your System
 "Storms", a song by Fleetwood Mac from Tusk
 "The Storm" (Notaker song), 2018
 "The Storm", a song by Big Country from The Crossing
 "The Storm", a song by Blackmore's Night from Fires at Midnight
 "The Storm", a song by Fat Mattress from Fat Mattress II, 1970
 "The Storm", a song by Jim Reeves
 "The Storm (Outro)", a song by Tinashe from Aquarius
 "The Storm", a story track from 1993 album Stories and Songs: The Adventures of Captain Feathersword the Friendly Pirate by The Wiggles

Television 
 The Storm (miniseries), a 2009 science fiction miniseries
 "Storm" (Law & Order: Special Victims Unit), 2005
 "The Storm" (Avatar: The Last Airbender episode), 2005
 "The Storm" (Modern Family), 2016
 "The Storm" (Stargate Atlantis), 2004
 "The Storm" (The Walking Dead), 2019

Other uses in arts and entertainment
 A Storm, a 1922 painting by Georgia O'Keeffe
 The Storm (painting), by Pierre Auguste Cot
 Storm (Don Lawrence), a comic book series

Brands and enterprises
 Storm (ice cream), a dessert sold at Hungry Jack's fast food restaurants
 Storm (soft drink), made by PepsiCo
 Beretta Cx4 Storm, a pistol-carbine gun
 BlackBerry Storm, a smartphone
 Storm Aircraft, an Italian manufacturer
 Storm Financial, a defunct Australian company
 Storm Management, a British model agency
 The Storm (radio station), UK
 Storm, a former publishing label of Sales Curve Interactive

Computing and science
 Storm (software), an SQL object-relational mapper
 Apache Storm, a distributed realtime computing system
 Stochastic optical reconstruction microscopy, or STORM, a light imaging technique
 Storm botnet

Land vehicles
 AIL Storm, an off-road vehicle used by Israeli security forces
 Geo Storm, a sport compact car
 Lister Storm, a British racing car first manufactured in 1993
 San Storm, an Indian sports car manufactured
 Storms (automobile), an electric cycle-car

Military
 , a Royal Navy Second World War submarine
 HNoMS Storm, any of various Royal Norwegian Navy torpedo and patrol boats
 Operation Storm, a Croatian military operation
 Storm-class patrol boat, formerly built for the Royal Norwegian Navy

Sports teams

Australia
 Melbourne Storm, an Australian rugby league team
 Sydney Storm (1992–1999), a defunct Australian Baseball League team, originally the Sydney Blues

Canada

Hockey 
 Campbell River Storm, a junior "B" ice hockey team in British Columbia
 Deseronto Storm, a junior ice hockey team in Ontario
 Grande Prairie Storm, a junior ice hockey team in Alberta
 Guelph Storm, a major junior ice hockey team in Ontario
 Kamloops Storm, a junior ice hockey team in British Columbia
 Simcoe Storm, a Canadian junior ice hockey team

Other sports 
 Durham Storm (1998–2005), a defunct soccer team in Ontario
 Island Storm, a basketball team in Prince Edward Island

Germany
 Karlsruhe Storm, a German lacrosse team

Norway
 Bergen Storm, an American football team in Norway
 Storms BK, a Norwegian association football club

United Kingdom
 Derby Storm (1984–2002), a former British Basketball League team
 Manchester Storm (1995–2002), a British former ice hockey team
 Manchester Storm (2015–), a British ice hockey team
 Western Storm, a women's cricket team based in South West England

United States

American football 
 Portland Storm (1973–1975), a defunct World Football League team
 Sioux Falls Storm, an indoor football team
 Tampa Bay Storm, an arena football team

Baseball and softball 
 Lake Elsinore Storm, a minor league baseball team
 Chicago Storm (softball), a professional softball team, 1977–78

Basketball 
 Oklahoma Storm (1990–2007), a defunct United States Basketball League team
 Seattle Storm, a WNBA basketball team

Hockey 
 Toledo Storm (1991–2007), a defunct minor league ice hockey team
 Tri-City Storm, a Tier 1 junior ice hockey team

Lacrosse 
 Anaheim Storm (2004–2005), a defunct National Lacrosse League team
 New Jersey Storm (2002–2003), a defunct National Lacrosse League team

Soccer 
 Boston Storm (soccer) (1994–1995), a defunct USISL team
 Buffalo Storm (1984), a defunct USL soccer team
 California Storm, a women's soccer team, originally the Sacramento Storm (1995)
 Memphis Storm (1986–1994), a defunct AISA and USISL soccer team
 New Orleans Storm (1993–1999), a defunct USISL soccer team, originally named the New Orleans Riverboat Gamblers
 Seattle Storm (soccer) (1984–1995), a defunct soccer team
 St. Louis Storm (1989–1992), a defunct Major Indoor Soccer League team

Schools 
 The Storm, the athletics teams of Simpson College, Indianola, Iowa
 Storm, the athletics teams of Celebration High School in Celebration, Florida
 Storm, the athletics teams of Crown College, St. Bonifacius, Minnesota
 Storm, the athletics teams of Keuka College, Keuka Park, New York
 Storm, the athletics teams of Lake Erie College, Painesville, Ohio

Other uses
 Save the Oak Ridges Moraine (STORM), a Canadian environmental organization
 The Storm (conspiracy theory), put forward by QAnon

See also 

 Storme, a list of people with the given name or surname
 Tata Safari Storme, a model of the Tata Safari SUV
 , a destroyer launched during World War II